Walter Milliken is a writer and game designer who has worked on a number of GURPS products for Steve Jackson Games.

Career
Walter Milliken ran the GURPS Digest discussion list on the internet in the early 1990s.

In a lawsuit that received national attention and led to the establishment of the Electronic Frontier Foundation, Milliken and Steve Jackson successfully sued the United States Secret Service in 1993 for illegally seizing computers and electronic information.

Walter Milliken is the co-author of GURPS Illuminati University, and contributor to many GURPS books. There is a list of his other work at www.pen-paper.net (archive). He is married to his frequent co-author, Elizabeth McCoy.

References

American game designers
GURPS writers
Living people
Place of birth missing (living people)
Year of birth missing (living people)